Arturo Char Chaljub (born 5 November 1967) is a former Senator of Colombia. Prior to his appointment he served as First Secretary of the Colombian Embassy in London.

Family
Arturo comes from a well established and influential, Syrian-Arab-Colombian family, he is the son of Fuad Char Abdala, a Liberal Senator of Colombia and former Minister of Economic Development, and Ambassador of Colombia to Portugal, and his wife Adela Chaljub Char. His brother, Alejandro Char Chaljub is the current Mayor of Barranquilla, and his cousin, David Char Navas, is also a senator. Many of his relatives, are shareholders of the Junior Barranquilla, the city's foremost soccer team. He married Alessandra Warner Sánchez, whom he met while studying at Kennesaw State University in Georgia, United States. Together they have five children, Fuad, John, Adela, Arturo and Victoria.

See also
 José David Name

References

1967 births
People from Barranquilla
Living people
Arturo
Colombian people of Syrian descent
Radical Change politicians
Members of the Senate of Colombia
Kennesaw State University alumni